Veliki Ostros (Albanian: Ostrosi i Madh) is a village in the municipality of Bar, Montenegro. It is located close to the Albanian border in the Skadarska Krajina region, by Lake Skadar.

Demographics
According to the 2011 census, its population was 332.

References

Populated places in Bar Municipality
Albanian communities in Montenegro